Neelah Dullah Interchange is the newest interchange on the M2 motorway in District Chakwal. It is the third interchange in the district after Balkasar and Kallar Kahar Interchange. It exits the M2 motorway at Neelah Road. It facilitates the village of Neelah, Dullah people and all other nearby villages.

Location 
It is situated between the Chakri Interchange and Balkasar Interchange. It is the 16th exit on the motorway moving from Lahore to Islamabad.
and 2nd exit moving from Islamabad to Lahore.

See also
Chakwal Police And Rescue Departements
Tourism in Chakwal
Balkasar Interchange
Kallar Kahar Interchange
Chakwal Transport System

Road interchanges in Pakistan